Gishi (also Romanized as Gīshī; also known as Kīshī) is a village in Ruydar Rural District, Ruydar District, Khamir County, Hormozgan Province, Iran. At the 2006 census, its population was 338, in 65 families.

References 

Populated places in Khamir County